José Alfredo Valdez (born March 1, 1990) is a Dominican professional baseball pitcher who is a free agent. He previously played in Major League Baseball (MLB) for the Detroit Tigers, Los Angeles Angels, San Diego Padres and San Francisco Giants. He also played in the Chinese Professional Baseball League (CPBL) for the CTBC Brothers and Fubon Guardians.

Career

Detroit Tigers
Valdez played for the Dominican Summer League Tigers from 2009 to 2011. He played for the Gulf Coast Tigers in 2012. He played the 2013 season with the West Michigan Whitecaps and the Lakeland Flying Tigers and was the closer for both teams. He finished the season with 33 saves and a 2.74 earned run average. He was added to the Tigers 40-man roster on November 20, 2013. 

Valdez was recalled by the Tigers on July 31, 2015, and made his major league debut later that night in a game against the Baltimore Orioles. In his debut, Valdez faced four batters, allowing three hits, two earned runs, and one walk, without recording an out in the inning, and taking the loss. Prior to being recalled, Valdez was 2–0 with one save, and a 2.03 ERA over his last 10 games with the Toledo Mud Hens. He was optioned back to Toledo on August 4 after his lone start to make room on the roster for Matt Boyd, who started the next day. 

Valdez had a 4–4 record and a 3.44 ERA in 38 appearances with Toledo, having allowed 44 hits over 52 innings, with 33 walks and 40 strikeouts. Valdez was called up to the Tigers again on August 20, 2015, when starters Daniel Norris and Aníbal Sánchez were placed on the disabled list. He made a total of seven appearances (9 innings) with the big-league club in 2015.

Los Angeles Angels
On June 7, 2016, the Tigers traded Valdez to the Los Angeles Angels in exchange for cash considerations.

San Diego Padres
Valdez was claimed off waivers by the San Diego Padres on May 10, 2017.

San Francisco Giants
Valdez signed a minor league contract with the San Francisco Giants in January 2018. He elected free agency on November 2, 2018.

Diablos Rojos del México
On March 21, 2019, Valdez signed with the Diablos Rojos del México of the Mexican League. He was released on May 1, 2019.

Rieleros de Aguascalientes
On May 10, 2019, Valdez signed with the Rieleros de Aguascalientes of the Mexican League. He was released on December 31, 2019.

Pericos de Puebla
On May 20, 2021, Valdez signed with the Pericos de Puebla of the Mexican League.

CTBC Brothers
On September 29, 2021, Valdez signed with the CTBC Brothers of the Chinese Professional Baseball League. Valdez started the Taiwan Series–clinching game against the Uni-President Lions, throwing 8 scoreless innings with 5 strikeouts and earning the MVP of the Game award. He was not re-signed for the 2022 season, and became a free agent.

Fubon Guardians
On February 7, 2022, Valdez signed with the Fubon Guardians of the Chinese Professional Baseball League for the 2022 season. He pitched to a 4.17 ERA and 1.43 WHIP over 49.2 innings. Valdez was released on July 28, 2022.

References

External links

 
1990 births
Living people
Cañeros de Los Mochis players
Cardenales de Lara players
Detroit Tigers players
Diablos Rojos del México players
Dominican Republic expatriate baseball players in Venezuela
Dominican Republic expatriate baseball players in Mexico
Dominican Republic expatriate baseball players in Taiwan
Dominican Republic expatriate baseball players in the United States
Dominican Summer League Tigers players
El Paso Chihuahuas players
Erie SeaWolves players
Fubon Guardians players
Gigantes del Cibao players
Gulf Coast Tigers players
Lakeland Flying Tigers players
Los Angeles Angels players
Major League Baseball pitchers
Major League Baseball players from the Dominican Republic
Mexican League baseball pitchers
Pericos de Puebla players
Rieleros de Aguascalientes players
Sacramento River Cats players
Salt Lake Bees players
San Diego Padres players
San Francisco Giants players
Toledo Mud Hens players
West Michigan Whitecaps players